The MV Tokitae is an  passenger ferry operated by Washington State Ferries which entered service on June 30, 2014. It serves the Mukilteo-Clinton route.

Naming

On November 13, 2012, the Washington State Transportation Commission named the ferry Tokitae. Tokitae is a colloquial greeting that means "nice day, pretty colors" in the language of the Coast Salish indigenous people. It is also the name of an orca captured at Penn Cove, Whidbey Island, which was renamed "Lolita" and now performs at the Miami Seaquarium.

History

Construction

The contracts for the Tokitae were signed on November 1, 2011, and its keel was laid on March 29, 2012.

The Tokitaes hull was rolled out of the Vigor construction building onto a drydock on March 2, 2013. It was joined by the completed superstructure the following week; it was built by Nichols Brothers Boat Builders of Freeland, a community on Whidbey Island.

The ferry was floated out of its dry dock and launched in Elliott Bay on July 19, 2013. The Tokitae was christened by state Secretary of Transportation Lynn Peterson on March 20, 2014 at Vigor, during a ceremony opened to the media, officials and workers.

Launch

The official public unveiling occurred on June 8, 2014, at the Clinton ferry terminal. The ferry made its maiden voyage on June 30, 2014. The Tokitaes first week of service was marred by a hydraulic leak and a design flaw that caused cars to scrape against the car ramps.

On April 13, 2015, with 174 passengers on board, the Tokitae lost one of its engines and went dead in the water for about an hour. The vessel used a tug to get to Mukilteo where the passengers disembarked. The Tokitae then drifted around Possession Sound until the problem was fixed.

The Tokitae had lost propulsion a total of 18 times in its first 13 months, causing frequent delays. Regular passengers quipped that "If there's a delay, it's probably the Tokitae".

References

External links

Ferry Plans
Washington State Ferries class information

Washington State Ferries vessels
2013 ships
Ships built in Seattle